No. 513 Squadron RAF was a non-operational bomber squadron of the Royal Air Force in 1943.

History
No. 513 squadron was formed from a flight of No. 218 Squadron on 15 September 1943 at RAF Witchford, Cambridgeshire. It worked up for the Short Stirling bomber, but did not obtain operational status, as its aircraft were more needed at the Stirling conversion units and was disbanded on 21 November 1943.

Aircraft operated

Squadron bases

Commanding officers

See also
List of Royal Air Force aircraft squadrons

References

Notes

Bibliography

Bomber squadrons of the Royal Air Force in World War II
Military units and formations established in 1943
Military units and formations disestablished in 1943